Events from the year 1929 in France.

Incumbents
President: Gaston Doumergue 
President of the Council of Ministers: 
 until 29 July: Raymond Poincaré
 29 July-2 November: Aristide Briand
 starting 2 November: André Tardieu

Events
24 July – Prime Minister Raymond Poincaré resigns for medical reasons – he is succeeded by Aristide Briand.
24 July – The Kellogg–Briand Pact, renouncing war as an instrument of foreign policy, goes into effect (it was first signed in Paris on 27 August 1928 by most leading world powers).
5 September – Briand presents his plan of the United States of Europe.
22 October – Briand's government falls.

Arts and literature
15 January – First issue of Annales d'histoire économique et sociale published in by Armand Colin.
October
Jean-Paul Sartre and Simone de Beauvoir become a couple, having met for the first time while he studied at the École Normale Supérieure in Paris. 21-year-old De Beauvoir becomes the youngest person ever to obtain the agrégation in philosophy, and comes second in the final examination, beaten only by Sartre.
 La galerie Goemans opens in Paris with a Surrealist exhibition including Yves Tanguy.

Sport
30 June – Tour de France begins.
28 July – Tour de France ends, won by Maurice De Waele of Belgium.

Births

January to June
20 January
Jean-Jacques Perrey, electronic music producer (died 2016)
5 February – Luc Ferrari, composer (died 2005)
6 February – Pierre Brice, actor (died 2015)
7 February – François Fontan, politician (died 1979)
8 February – Claude Rich, actor and screenwriter (d. 2017)
10 February – Bertrand Poirot-Delpech, journalist, essayist and novelist (died 2006)
19 February – Jacques Deray, film director (died 2003)
7 April – Bob Denard, mercenary (died 2007)
8 April – François Bruhat, mathematician (died 2007)
23 April – George Steiner, literary critic and philosopher (died 2020)
1 May – Valentin Huot, racing cyclist (died 2017)
31 May – Joseph Bernardo, Olympic swimmer
27 June – Maurice Couve de Murville, Roman Catholic Archbishop of Birmingham (died 2007)

July to December
13 July – René Laloux, animator and film director (died 2004)
15 July – Alain Porthault, French former sprinter (died 2019)
16 July – Gaby Tanguy, French former swimmer (died 1981)
29 July – Jean Baudrillard, philosopher and sociologist (died 2007)
9 September – Claude Nougaro, singer and songwriter (died 2004)
21 September – Georges Bernier, also known as Le Professeur Choron, humorist (died 2005)
19 October – Henri Cueco, painter (died 2017)
23 October – Josy Moinet, politician (died 2018)
11 November – Gwenc'hlan Le Scouëzec, writer and Grand Druid of Brittany (died 2008)
20 November – Raymond Lefèvre, orchestra leader, arranger and composer (died 2008)
7 December – Gilles Thomas, science fiction writer (died 1985)

Full date unknown
Christine Renard, writer (died 1979)

Deaths

January to June
21 January – Étienne Aymonier, linguist, explorer and archaeologist (born 1844)
30 January – La Goulue, dancer (born 1866)
19 February – Joseph Valentin Boussinesq, mathematician and physicist (born 1842)
15 March – Félix Balzer, physician (born 1849)
20 March – Ferdinand Foch, Marshal of France, military theorist and writer (born 1851)
22 April – Henry Lerolle, painter, art collector and patron (born 1848)
24 April – Caroline Rémy de Guebhard, socialist, journalist and feminist (born 1855)
25 June – Charles-Victor Langlois, historian and paleographer (born 1863)

July to December
10 August – Pierre Fatou, mathematician (born 1878)
23 September – Louis-Ernest Dubois, Roman Catholic cardinal and Archbishop of Paris (born 1856)
1 October – Antoine Bourdelle, sculptor (born 1861)
24 November – Georges Clemenceau, statesman, physician, journalist and Prime Minister (born 1841)
20 December – Émile Loubet, politician and 7th President of France (born 1838)
21 December – Gustave Belot, professor and philosopher (born 1859)

See also
 List of French films of 1929

References

1920s in France